Champions League 2008 may refer to:
 AFC Champions League 2008
 CAF Champions League 2008